Borghild (and versions like Burghild and Borghildur) is a female given name formed from "borg" (protection) and "hild" (battle).

As of December 31, 2005, there were 585 persons in Sweden named Borghild.  It is more common in Norway.  In August 2006 there were 4213 women in Norway named Borghild.  The name was at its top in 1905.

Borghild
 Borghild, wife of Sigmund
 Borghild Bondevik Haga (1906–1990), Norwegian politician 
 Borghild Niskin (1924–2013), Norwegian alpine skier 
 Borghild Røyseland (1926–2020), Norwegian politician
 Borghild Tenden (born 1951), Norwegian politician

Scandinavian feminine given names
Norwegian feminine given names